Order: ApodiformesFamily: Trochilidae

Hummingbirds are small birds capable of hovering in mid-air due to the rapid flapping of their wings. They are the only birds that can fly backwards.

Unless otherwise noted, all species listed below are considered to occur regularly in North America as permanent residents, summer or winter residents or visitors, or migrants. The following codes are used to designate some species:

(A) Accidental - occurrence based on one or two (rarely more) records, and unlikely to occur regularly
(C) Casual - occurrence based on two or a few records, with subsequent records not improbable
(E) Extinct - a recent species that no longer exists
(Ex) Extirpated - a species which no longer occurs in North America, but populations still exist elsewhere
(I) Introduced - a population established solely as result of direct or indirect human intervention; synonymous with non-native and non-indigenous

Conservation status - IUCN Red List of Threatened Species:
 - Extinct,  - Extinct in the wild
 - Critically endangered,  - Endangered,  - Vulnerable
 - Near threatened,  - Least concern
 - Data deficient,  - Not evaluated
(v. 2013.2, the data is current as of March 5, 2014)
and Endangered Species Act:
 - endangered,  - threatened
,  - experimental non essential or essential population
,  - endangered or threatened due to similarity of appearance
(including taxa not necessarily found in the United States, the data is current as of June 8, 2012.)

List of hummingbirds known to occur in North America

Bronzy hermit, Glaucis aeneus 
Rufous-breasted hermit, Glaucis hirsutus 
Band-tailed barbthroat, Threnetes ruckeri 
Green hermit, Phaethornis guy 
Little hermit, Phaethornis longuemareus 
Long-billed hermit, Phaethornis longirostris 
Mexican hermit, Phaethornis mexicanus (NR)
Pale-bellied hermit, Phaethornis anthophilus 
White-whiskered hermit, Phaethornis yaruqui (A) 
Stripe-throated hermit, Phaethornis striigularis 
White-tipped sicklebill, Eutoxeres aquila 
Tooth-billed hummingbird, Androdon aequatorialis 
Green-fronted lancebill, Doryfera ludovicae 
Scaly-breasted hummingbird, Phaeochroa cuvierii 
Wedge-tailed sabrewing, Campylopterus curvipennis 
Long-tailed sabrewing, Campylopterus excellens 
Rufous sabrewing, Campylopterus rufus 
Violet sabrewing, Campylopterus hemileucurus 
White-tailed sabrewing, Campylopterus ensipennis 
White-necked jacobin, Florisuga mellivora 
Brown violetear, Colibri delphinae 
Mexican violetear, Colibri thalassinus 
Lesser violetear, Colibri cyanotus
Green-breasted mango, Anthracothorax prevostii 
Green-throated mango, Anthracothorax viridigula 
Black-throated mango, Anthracothorax nigricollis 
Veraguan mango, Anthracothorax veraguensis 
Hispaniolan mango, Anthracothorax dominicus 
Puerto Rican mango, Anthracothorax aurulentus 
Green mango, Anthracothorax viridis 
Jamaican mango, Anthracothorax mango 
Purple-throated carib, Eulampis jugularis 
Green-throated carib, Eulampis holosericeus 
Ruby-topaz hummingbird, Chrysolampis mosquitus 
Antillean crested hummingbird, Orthorhyncus cristatus 
Violet-headed hummingbird, Klais guimeti 
Emerald-chinned hummingbird, Abeillia abeillei 
Short-crested coquette, Lophornis brachylophus 
Rufous-crested coquette, Lophornis delattrei 
Black-crested coquette, Lophornis helenae 
White-crested coquette, Lophornis adorabilis 
Tufted coquette, Lophornis ornatus 
Green thorntail, Discosura conversii 
Golden-crowned emerald, Chlorostilbon auriceps 
Cozumel emerald, Chlorostilbon forficatus 
Canivet's emerald, Chlorostilbon canivetii 
Garden emerald, Chlorostilbon assimilis 
Cuban emerald, Chlorostilbon ricordii 
Brace's emerald, Chlorostilbon bracei (E) 
Hispaniolan emerald, Chlorostilbon swainsonii 
Puerto Rican emerald, Chlorostilbon maugaeus 
Blue-tailed emerald, Chlorostilbon mellisugus 
Green-tailed emerald, Chlorostilbon alice 
Blue-chinned sapphire, Chlorestes notatus 
Golden-tailed sapphire, Chrysuronia oenone 
White-tailed goldenthroat, Polytmus guainumbi 
Dusky hummingbird, Cynanthus sordidus 
Broad-billed hummingbird, Cynanthus latirostris 
Blue-headed hummingbird, Cyanophaia bicolor 
Mexican woodnymph, Thalurania ridgwayi 
Crowned woodnymph, Thalurania colombica 
Violet-crowned woodnymph, Thalurania colombica colombica
Green-crowned woodnymph, Thalurania colombica fannyi 
Fork-tailed woodnymph, Thalurania furcata 
Fiery-throated hummingbird, Panterpe insignis 
Violet-bellied hummingbird, Damophila julie 
Sapphire-throated hummingbird, Lepidopyga coeruleogularis 
Humboldt's sapphire, Hylocharis humboldtii 
Blue-throated goldentail, Hylocharis eliciae 
White-eared hummingbird, Hylocharis leucotis 
Xantus's hummingbird, Hylocharis xantusii 
Violet-capped hummingbird, Goldmania violiceps 
Pirre hummingbird, Goethalsia bella 
Streamertail, Trochilus polytmus 
Buffy hummingbird, Leucippus fallax 
Glittering-throated emerald, Amazilia fimbriata (A) 
White-chested emerald, Amazilia brevirostris 
White-bellied emerald, Amazilia candida 
Honduran emerald, Amazilia luciae 
Blue-chested hummingbird, Amazilia amabilis 
Charming hummingbird, Amazilia decora 
Mangrove hummingbird, Amazilia boucardi 
Azure-crowned hummingbird, Amazilia cyanocephala 
Berylline hummingbird, Amazilia beryllina 
Blue-tailed hummingbird, Amazilia cyanura 
Steely-vented hummingbird, Amazilia saucerottei 
Snowy-bellied hummingbird, Amazilia edward 
Rufous-tailed hummingbird, Amazilia tzacatl 
Buff-bellied hummingbird, Amazilia yucatanensis 
Cinnamon hummingbird, Amazilia rutila 
Violet-crowned hummingbird, Amazilia violiceps 
Green-fronted hummingbird, Amazilia viridifrons 
Copper-rumped hummingbird, Amazilia tobaci 
Stripe-tailed hummingbird, Eupherusa eximia 
Blue-capped hummingbird, Eupherusa cyanophrys 
White-tailed hummingbird, Eupherusa poliocerca 
Black-bellied hummingbird, Eupherusa nigriventris 
White-tailed emerald, Elvira chionura 
Coppery-headed emerald, Elvira cupreiceps 
Snowcap, Microchera albocoronata 
White-vented plumeleteer, Chalybura buffonii 
Bronze-tailed plumeleteer, Chalybura urochrysia 
Green-throated mountain-gem, Lampornis viridipallens 
Green-breasted mountain-gem, Lampornis sybillae 
Amethyst-throated hummingbird, Lampornis amethystinus 
Blue-throated hummingbird, Lampornis clemenciae 
White-bellied mountain-gem, Lampornis hemileucus 
Purple-throated mountain-gem, Lampornis calolaemus 
White-throated mountain-gem, Lampornis castaneoventris 
Garnet-throated hummingbird, Lamprolaima rhami 
Green-crowned brilliant, Heliodoxa jacula 
Magnificent hummingbird, Eugenes fulgens 
Greenish puffleg, Haplophaedia aureliae 
Purple-crowned fairy, Heliothryx barroti 
Long-billed starthroat, Heliomaster longirostris 
Plain-capped starthroat, Heliomaster constantii 
Bahama woodstar, Calliphlox evelynae 
Inagua woodstar, Calliphlox lyrura NR
Magenta-throated woodstar, Philodice bryantae 
Purple-throated woodstar, Philodice mitchellii 
Rufous-shafted woodstar, Chaetocercus jourdanii 
Slender sheartail, Doricha enicura 
Mexican sheartail, Doricha eliza 
Sparkling-tailed hummingbird, Tilmatura dupontii 
Lucifer hummingbird, Calothorax lucifer 
Beautiful hummingbird, Calothorax pulcher 
Ruby-throated hummingbird, Archilochus colubris 
Black-chinned hummingbird, Archilochus alexandri 
Vervain hummingbird, Mellisuga minima 
Bee hummingbird, Mellisuga helenae 
Anna's hummingbird, Calypte anna 
Costa's hummingbird, Calypte costae 
Calliope hummingbird, Stellula calliope 
Bumblebee hummingbird, Atthis heloisa 
Wine-throated hummingbird, Atthis ellioti 
Broad-tailed hummingbird, Selasphorus platycercus 
Rufous hummingbird, Selasphorus rufus 
Allen's hummingbird, Selasphorus sasin 
Volcano hummingbird, Selasphorus flammula 
Glow-throated hummingbird, Selasphorus ardens 
Scintillant hummingbird, Selasphorus scintilla

References

hummingbird
'North America
'hummingbird